Corydoras cortesi is a tropical freshwater fish belonging to the subfamily Corydoradinae of the family Callichthyidae found in Colombia.

References

Corydoras
Endemic fauna of Colombia
Freshwater fish of Colombia
Fish described in 1987